Latiginella is a genus of parasitic flies in the family Tachinidae.

Species
Latiginella handeni Verbeke, 1963
Latiginella rufogrisea Villeneuve, 1936

References

Exoristinae
Tachinidae genera
Taxa named by Joseph Villeneuve de Janti
Diptera of Africa